Barrah bint ʿAbd al-Muṭṭalib (Arabic: برة بنت عبد المطلب) was an aunt of Muhammad, regarded as the final prophet of Islam. She was born in Mecca, the daughter of Abd al-Muttalib and Fatima bint Amr. Her siblings included Abdullah ibn Abd al-Muttalib, Al-Zubayr ibn Abd al-Muttalib, and Abu Talib ibn Abd al-Muttalib.

Life 
She was married twice. Her first husband was Abd al-Asad ibn Hilal, a member of the Makhzum clan of the Quraysh tribe. Their sons were named Abd Allah (later known as Abu Salama), Sufyan, and Aswad. Abu Salama and Sufyan became Muslims while Aswad did not. Aswad was later killed in the Battle of Badr.

Her second husband was Abu Ruhm ibn Abd al-Uzza from the Amir ibn Luayy clan of the Quraysh. Their son was named Abu Sabra. Barra died a believer of one God; Allah. Her husband went on to marry Maymunah bint al-Harith, who later married Muhammad.

References

Family of Muhammad
People from Mecca
Banu Hashim
6th-century Arabs